There are about 4,959 species of moths in Italy. The moths (mostly nocturnal) and butterflies (mostly diurnal) together make up the taxonomic order Lepidoptera.

The links below are for moth families that have been recorded in Italy, including San Marino, Sardinia, Sicily and Vatican City.


A-E

F-M

N-P

Q-Z

See also
List of butterflies of Italy

External links
Fauna Europaea

Moths
Italy
Italy
Italy